Red Hot Riplets is a kind of spicy potato chips sold in St. Louis, Missouri. Red Hot Riplets are ridge-cut chips covered with hot chili pepper and sweet barbecue powdered seasoning. The label describes the flavoring as "St. Louis Style Hot Sauce".

Old Vienna Snack Food Co. distributes Riplets locally. The chips are sold at many local businesses, from mom and pop stores to chains such as Schnucks and even 7-Eleven.

Flavor 
Red Hot Riplets are spicier than potato chips available in national brands.

The chips have a bright red color that comes naturally from the powdered peppers. Red Hot Riplets used to be fried in partially hydrogenated vegetable shortening, but they are now fried in liquid vegetable oils.

Old Vienna has also made Red Hot Thins with same seasoning on thin-cut potato chips, Cheesy Red Hot Riplets with the addition of a cheese powder, and Red Hot Pork rinds. 

In 2003 Esquire magazine included Red Hot Riplets in their article and list "Best Potato Chips You've Never Tasted".

Manufacturer 
Old Vienna Snack Food Company was founded in 1936 by Louis Kaufman in St. Louis. The firm changed hands many times before folding in 1996. In that same year, a group of former employees resurrected the brand, which continues to be headquartered in the city of Fenton, a suburb of St. Louis.  , the company had about 20 employees.

As of late 2007, there was a bottled hot sauce with a label similar to the Red Hot Riplets bag, that contained "St. Louis Style" hot sauce. The hot sauce was discontinued, but was brought back in 2018.

Distribution of the seasoning is throughout the St, Louis region at local markets, gas stations, and will be available in St. Louis grocery stores in Spring of 2017.
Many St. Louis restaurants have also added new menu items featuring the Red Hot Riplet Seasoning.

Their other products include:
Cheesy Red Hot Riplets Potato Chips
Red Hot Riplets Potato (Thins) (Discontinued)
Hot Corn Chips (Red Hot Riplet spiced corn chips.)
Sweet & Tangy Corn Chips
Cheese Popcorn
White Cheddar Popcorn
Hot Cheese Popcorn
Hot Diggety's Corn Puffs (Discontinued)
Original Pork Rinds
Red Hot Pork Rinds
Bar B Que Pork Rinds
Red Hot Riplets Nuggets
Movie Theatre Popcorn

In popular culture
The chips are also known outside of St. Louis because of the rappers Murphy Lee and Nelly.  Murphy Lee wrote a song "Red Hot Riplets" (from the album Murphy's Law) that mentions them in the chorus. When Murphy Lee was included in the Rap Snacks line of chips, he had them duplicate the Red Hot Riplets recipe as his flavor of Rap Snacks.

Notes

External links
 Old Vienna company website
 2004 Riverfront Times Best Potato Chips

Cuisine of St. Louis
Brand name snack foods